The Rio Liberdade State Forest  is a state forest in the state of Acre, Brazil.

Location

The Rio Liberdade State Forest is in the municipality of Tarauacá in the state of Acre.
The forest is bounded to the north by the BR-364 highway and the Mogno State Forest.
To the west it adjoins the Riozinho da Liberdade Extractive Reserve.
The Igarapé Tarauaê, a tributary of the Gregório River, rises in the forest and flow to the northeast.

History

The Rio Liberdade State Forest was created on 9 March 2004.
The consultative council for the Rio Gregório State Forest complex was created by decree on 19 September 2008.
This covers the Rio Gregório, Mogno and Rio Liberdade state forests, all of which had been created on the same date.
The governor installed the council members in April 2012.

People and economy

As of April 2012 there were 422 families in the Rio Gregório Forest Complex, which covered  in total.
The state's Department of Industry, Trade and Sustainable Services (SEDENS) had a number of plans for the complex.
These included providing two new trucks to support the communities, making football fields in each community, providing coordinators to arrange meetings, resuming production of tree seedlings and providing assistance with family farming, small livestock and fish farming.
Wood processing factories were to be built in Cruzeiro do Sul and Tarauacá.

Notes

Sources

2004 establishments in Brazil
State forests of Brazil
Protected areas of Acre (state)
Protected areas established in 2004